Saly Ruth Ramler (1894–1993), also known as Saly Ruth Struik, was the first woman to receive a mathematics PhD from the German University in Prague, now known as Charles University.  Her 1919 dissertation, on the axioms of affine geometry, was supervised by Gerhard Kowalewski and Georg Alexander Pick. She married the Dutch mathematician and historian of mathematics Dirk Jan Struik in 1923. Between 1924 and 1926, the pair traveled Europe and met many prominent mathematicians, using Dirk Struik's Rockefeller fellowship. In 1926, they emigrated to the United States, and Dirk Struik accepted a position at MIT.

References

External links

People from Kolomyia
20th-century Czech mathematicians
1894 births
1993 deaths
20th-century women mathematicians
Charles University alumni
20th-century American mathematicians
Czechoslovak emigrants to the United States